The Great Movement is a 2021 Bolivian drama film written and directed by Kiro Russo. The film had its world premiere at the 78th Venice International Film Festival on September 6, 2021 and is set to be released in theaters in 2022. It was selected as the Bolivian entry for the Best International Feature Film at the 94th Academy Awards.

Plot
In present-day Bolivia, Elder takes a week-long walk to La Paz alongside his young miner friends to demand a reinstatement of their job. However, Elder suddenly falls ill, causing him to suffer frequent choking and shortness of breath after having found work in a local market. As his condition gets worse, he enlists the help of the elderly Mamá Pancha, who sends him to Max – a homeless witch doctor, hermit, and clown – who could have the ability to bring Elder back to life.

Cast
 Julio Cézar Ticona as Elder
 Max Eduardo Bautista Uchasara as Max
 Francisca Arce de Aro as Mamá Pancha
 Israel Hurtado as Gallo
 Gustavo Milán as Gato

Production
On November 28, 2016, it was announced that Bolivian filmmaker Kiro Russo was developing Shewolf, a follow-up feature to his acclaimed directorial debut Dark Skull. Russo said that the film was set to be "a little more narrative" than Dark Skull "with comic and dramatic elements". The project was set to receive support from the Cannes Film Festival and the Mar del Plata International Film Festival.

Principal photography took place from April to November 2019 in La Paz, Bolivia and was shot entirely in Super 16 mm film. By November 2020, the film was completed under the redeveloped title El Gran Movimiento, with the film backed by the Doha Film Institute.

Release
The film had its world premiere at the 78th Venice International Film Festival on September 6, 2021, competing in the Horizons section. Following its festival run, the film is set to be released theatrically in 2022. On July 27, 2021, it was announced that Best Friend Forever, a Brussels-based sister company of French sales agent Indie Sales, was set to handle international sales for the film.

The film has also been officially invited in 'Harbour' section at the 51st International Film Festival Rotterdam to be held from January 26 to February 6, 2022. In December, 2022, the film was awarded the first prize Grand Coral for Best Feature Film at the 43rd International Film Festival of New Latin American Cinema in Havana.

See also
 List of submissions to the 94th Academy Awards for Best International Feature Film
 List of Bolivian submissions for the Academy Award for Best International Feature Film

References

External links
 
 

2021 films
2021 drama films
Bolivian drama films
Films about diseases
Films about homelessness
Films about social class
Films about society
Films about witchcraft
French drama films
Qatari drama films
Swiss drama films
Unemployment in fiction
2020s French films